Ennis is a surname. Notable people with the surname include:

Bruce Ennis (born 1939), American politician
Del Ennis (1925–1996), American Major League baseball player
Delloreen Ennis-London (born 1975), Jamaican sprint hurdler
Edward Ennis (1908–1990), American lawyer
Ethel Ennis (1932–2019), an American jazz musician
Garth Ennis (born 1970), Northern Irish comics writer
George Ennis (born 1953), Northern Irish politician
Glen Ennis (born 1964), Canadian rugby player
James Ennis (cricketer) (1900–1976), Irish cricketer
Jaron Ennis (born 1997), American boxer
James Ennis (basketball) (born 1990), American professional basketball player
Jeffrey Ennis (born 1952), British politician
Jessica Ennis (born 1986), British heptathlete
John Ennis (actor) (born 1964), American actor
John Ennis (baseball) (born 1979), American Major League baseball player
John Ennis (poet) (born 1944), Irish poet
John Matthew Ennis, known as J. Matthew Ennis (1864–1921), organist and academic in Adelaide, South Australia
Madeleine Ennis, Northern Irish pharmacologist
Michael Ennis (born 1984), Australian rugby league footballer
Mick Ennis (1901–1948), Australian rules footballer
Paul Ennis (born 1990), English footballer
Séamus Ennis (1919–1982), Irish folk musician and singer
Skinnay Ennis (1907–1963), American jazz and pop music bandleader and singer
Sue Ennis, American songwriter
 Tyler Ennis (basketball), Canadian NBA basketball player
Tyler Ennis (ice hockey), Canadian NHL hockey player

See also
Innis § Surname